State Route 248 (SR 248) is a  route that serves as a connection between U.S. Route 84 (US 84) in Enterprise with Fort Rucker.

Route description
The western terminus of SR 248 is located at its intersection with SR 27 just east of downtown Enterprise in Coffee County. From this point, the route travels in an easterly direction on two-lane undivided Glover Avenue, passing through residential areas. The road widens to four lanes and heads into commercial areas, coming to an intersection with US 84/SR 12/SR 167. Past this intersection, SR 248 becomes Rucker Boulevard and continues through areas of residential neighborhoods and businesses as a five-lane road with a center left-turn lane. Farther east, the road loses the center left-turn lane and continues through areas of fields, woods, and housing developments.
  The route enters Dale County and continues through a mix of homes and rural areas. SR 248 comes to its eastern terminus at the western gate of Fort Rucker.

Major intersections

References

248
Transportation in Coffee County, Alabama
Transportation in Dale County, Alabama
Enterprise, Alabama